Hyrum Smith (1800–1844) was a Latter Day Saint presiding patriarch and brother of movement founder Joseph Smith, Jr.

Hyrum Smith may also refer to:
Hyrum G. Smith (1879–1932), presiding patriarch of The Church of Jesus Christ of Latter-day Saints
Hyrum M. Smith (1872–1918), apostle of The Church of Jesus Christ of Latter-day Saints
Hyrum W. Smith (1943–2019), founder of Franklin Quest Co. and co-founder of FranklinCovey

See also
 Hiram Smith (disambiguation)
 
 List of people with surname Smith